Monsignor Vincenzo Regina (Alcamo, 9 May 1910 – Alcamo, 3 August 2009) was an Italian presbyter and historian.

Biography 
He was a figure of the clergy in Alcamo. He was ordained a priest in December 1932, when Alcamo still belonged to the Diocese of Mazara del Vallo. He devoted himself to believers and studies, he also taught Letters at the Gymnasium for three years and dogmatic theology in the seminary of Mazara del Vallo from 1937 until 1944.

A protagonist of the last 80 years in the history of Alcamo (as archpriest and parson for 47 years), he gave a stimulus to the Azione Cattolica and other parish associations.

He was a consultant of the Ministry of Cultural Heritage and Activities and Tourism and published several tens of books on the history, arts and representative figures of Alcamo, handing down, in this way, a patrimony of information for young people. Besides, thanks to his continual work of collecting, they could create the Sacred Art Museum in the Basilica of Our Lady of the Assumption.

In 2007, he published a new book with the title L'associazione antiracket e antiusura alcamese. Istituzione provvidenziale, an answer to the decalogue of the "perfect Mafioso" who discovered inside the den of the boss Salvatore Lo Piccolo. In 2004, he had published another book  along the same lines: Arpie del racket. Vampiri dell'usura with documents on the foundation of the Associazione Antiracket e Antiusura of Alcamo.

The Sacred Art Museum 
In the former premises of the Oratory of the Confraternity of Santissimo Sacramento (Very Holy Sacrament). In the hall of the old Oratory, with a modern and appropriate lighting system, they have arranged, all by date, paintings, statues, Church furnishings, vestments dating back to the beginning of the 15th century and the second half of the 19th century.

These artworks were collected by monsignor Vincenzo Regina, archpriest from 1944 to 1991; in accordance  with the suggestions of Second Vatican Council  about the care and attention for the ecclesiastical artistic patrimony, after the  1968 Belice earthquake he started collecting various paintings, sculptures and works of different kind, coming from churches that were unfit for use.

Recognitions and offices 
Honorary inspector for Monuments from 1945 to 1988 
Prize to Culture 1971,  presented by the Presidency of the Council of Ministers.
Member of the National Council of the Ministry of Cultural Heritage and Activities and Tourism
Member of the  Committee of Sector for Environmental and Architectural Heritage
Member of the Commission for the awarding of Certificates of Merit for Art and Culture 
Member of the National Commission for the safeguard of old Organs in Italy.

Works 

 Gli affreschi di Guglielmo Borremans nella Chiesa madre di Alcamo (simbolismo e significato; Mazara, Tip. B. Grillo, 1944
 La Chiesa madre di Alcamo : notizie storiche e artistiche; prefazione di Filippo Pottino, Alcamo: Accademia di studi Ciullo, 1956
 Brevi note su Alcamo del 1700; prefazione di Nicolo Domenico Evola, Alcamo: Accademia di studi Ciullo, 1956
 Giuseppe Renda, l'Aroddu: pittore alcamese del secolo 18°; prefazione di Alessandro Giuliana Alajmo; Accademia di studi Cielo di Alcamo, 1957
 La cappella quattrocentesca dello Spirito Santo nella chiesa madre di Alcamo / prefazione di Vincenzo Scuderi, Alcamo: Ediz. Accademia di studi Cielo d'Alcamo, 1960
 I pregevoli stucchi di Alcamo: da Giacomo Serpotta a Salvatore Raiano / prefazione di Giuseppe Cottone; Alcamo: Ediz. Accademia di studi Cielo D'Alcamo, 1962
 Il castello trecentesco dei conti di Modica in Alcamo; prefazione del prof. Virgilio Titone, Alcamo: Accademia di studi Cielo di Alcamo; ed. Boccone del Povero, Palermo, 1967
 Antonello Gagini e le sculture cinquecentesche in Alcamo, prefazione di Vincenzo Scuderi; Alcamo: Accademia di studi Cielo di Alcamo, 1969
 La Basilica di S. Maria Assunta in Alcamo; Alcamo: Edizioni Accademia di studi Cielo di Alcamo, 1969
 I cinquecenteschi codici miniati di Alcamo: al laboratorio di restauro del libro; Trapani: tip.Cartograf, 1971
 Profilo storico di Alcamo e le sue opere d'arte dalle origini al secolo 15.; prefazione di Paolo Collura; Accademia di Studi Cielo d'Alcamo, 1972, Trapani, Cartograf
 Storia, societa e cultura in Alcamo dal Cinque al Settecento; prefazione del ch.mo prof. Francesco Giunta,  Alcamo: Accademia di studi Cielo D'Alcamo, 1975
 Del più antico reliquiario di Alcamo; 1976
 Ottocento alcamese : storia e arte; Accademia di studi Cielo D'Alcamo; Trapani: Cartograf, 1977 
 Alcamo dalla prima guerra mondiale ai nostri giorni: appunti per la storia; presentazione di Francesco Brancato; Accademia di studi Cielo D'Alcamo, 1979
 Alcamo: storia, arte e tradizioni (Dalle origini al Cinquecento) vol.1: Palermo: Sellerio editore, (1980)
 Alcamo: storia, arte e tradizioni (Seicento e Settecento) vol. 2: Palermo: Sellerio editore, (1980)
 Alcamo: storia, arte e tradizioni (Dall'Ottocento all'autonomia siciliana) vol.3: Palermo: Sellerio editore, (1980)
 La più antica cinquecentina illustrata di Alcamo; Alcamo, 1980 
 Longarico, Bonifato e Alcamo: storia bimillenaria di un popolo, Alcamo, 1982 (Trapani: Cartograf)
 Bonifato terra sicana elima : da Longuro a Longarico; Alcamo, 1982
 Alcamo e le sue opere d'arte, Moncalieri: Jemmagrafica, 1983
 Il Museo alcamese d'arte sacra nella sua interpretazione storica teologica ed ecclesiologica; prefazione di Giovanni Fallani, Alcamo, 1984
 Calatubo dalla protostoria ai nostri giorni; Alcamo, 1985 (Trapani: Cartograf)
 Alcamo: paesaggio urbano e rurale; fotografie di Vincenzo Brai; Palermo: Leopardi, 1986
 Alcamo: immagini di religiosità popolare ; fotografie di Melo Minnella; Palermo: Aracne, 1987
 Don Giuseppe Rizzo e l'azione sociale dei cattolici dal 1860 al 1912; Palermo, Aracne, 1988
 Angeli e demoni nelle arti figurative della Sicilia; fotografie di Melo Minnella, Palermo: Aracne, 1989
 Brevi note sugli organi antichi e storici della provincia di Trapani; prefazione del maestro Arturo Sacchetti; Alcamo, 1991(Trapani: Cartograf)
 Alcamo: una città della Sicilia / Vincenzo Regina; prefazione di Massimo Ganci; fotografie di Melo Minnella, Palermo: Aracne, 1992
 Memoriale per la storia e l'arte: un insigne monumento salvato da tutelare; Alcamo, 1992 (Trapani: Tipolito Cartograf)
 Maria Maddalena nella storia, nella tradizione, nella leggenda e nelle arti figurative della provincia di Trapani; Alcamo, 1993
 Una compagnia quattro volte centenaria e l'Immacolata nel culto e nell'iconografia alcamese, Alcamo ed.Cartograf,1995
 Erice: cittadella dell'arte, della scienza e della solidarieta; foto di Melo Minnella, Palermo: Aracne (1995)
 Erice: cittadella dell'arte, della scienza e della solidarieta; foto di Melo Minnella; presentazione di Salvo Amoroso; introduzione di Vincenzo Adragna; Messina: Helios, (1996)
 Considerazioni storiche sugli argenti, i parati, sul museo alcamese d'arte sacra; Alcamo, 1996
 Il Santuario di Alcamo, 1997
 Alcamo:la chiesa di S. Oliva nella storia e nell'arte dei Gagini, di Pietro Novelli e di Giovan Biagio Amico; 1997 (Trapani: Cartogram)
 La chiesa parrocchiale di Sant'Anna in Alcamo: storia ed arte; Trapani: Cartogram, 1997
 I luoghi liturgici della Basilica di S. Maria Assunta Chiesa Madre di Alcamo;  1999 (Paceco: Abate)
 Alcamo la chiesa di Maria Santissima Annunziata; Gibellina: Edizioni Fondazione Orestiadi, 1999
 Guida alla lettura delle opere d'arte: Basilica di S. Maria Assunta Alcamo, Paceco (TP): Stampa Litotipografica Abate, 1999
 Il culto di S. Francesco di Paola in Alcamo: 450 anni di storia; Alcamo, Tipolitografia Sarograf, 2000
 Il culto eucaristico in Alcamo dal Cinquecento ai nostri giorni: spigolature artistiche e storiche; Alcamo: Sarograg, 2000
 La Chiesa di Maria Santissima del Rosario e i Domenicani in Alcamo;Paceco, Litotipografia Abate, 2000
 Le silografie d'una cinquecentina rubata e ritrovata; Alcamo, Grafiche Campo, 2001
 Cavalieri ospedalieri e pellegrini per le antiche vie della provincia di Trapani; 2002 (Alcamo: Arti grafiche Campo)
 Don Giuseppe Rizzo maestro di spiritualità; Alcamo, Campo, 2002
 Don Giuseppe Rizzo politico e giornalista; Alcamo, artigrafichecampo,2003
 Arpie del racket vampiri dell'usura; Alcamo: Associazione antiracket e antiusura alcamese, 2004
 L'organo a sette tastiere di Francesco La Grassa nella chiesa di S. Pietro a Trapani;  2004 (Alcamo: Arti grafiche Campo)
 La chiesa di San Pietro in Alcamo e l'architetto Giovan Biagio Amico; 2004 (Alcamo: Arti Grafiche Campo)
 La Chiesa parrocchiale ed il Convento di S. Maria di Gesù in Alcamo : storia e arte; 2005 (Alcamo: Campo)
 La chiesa parrocchiale del Sacro Cuore di Gesù in Alcamo e il suo primo parroco ; 2005 (Alcamo: Campo)
 La chiesa parrocchiale di San Giuseppe in Alcamo;  2005, Alcamo ed. Campo
 Il ventennale del Centro sociale terza età "Giovanni Paolo 2."; Alcamo, 1985-2005;  Alcamo:  2005 (Alcamo: Arti grafiche Campo)
 La chiesa della Madonna dell'Alto sul monte Bonifato;,2005, Alcamo, ed. Campo
 La chiesa parrocchiale di San Michele Arcangelo in Erice - Casa Santa e il suo parroco; 2006, Alcamo ed. Campo
 Mafia e antimafia nella storia di Alcamo, 2006
 Usi e costumi tradizionali, 2006
 L'approvvigionamento idrico di Alcamo : notizie storiche utili per la soluzione di un ricorrente problema; 2006 (Alcamo: Arti Grafiche Campo)
 Gli avvenimenti del Novecento nella vita e nella storia d'un alcamese quasi centenario / Giuseppe e Vincenzo Regina; Alcamo, Campo, 2006
 Pregate così, 2007
 L'Associazione Antiracket e Antiusura alcamese, istituzione provvidenziale, 2007
 Antiche leggende in opere d'arte sacra alcamese; 2007 (Alcamo: Campo)
 Il castello di Alcamo, 2007
 Fondatori di Ordini Religiosi. Affresco di Guglielmo Borremans
 Le avventure di due innamorati nel Novecento. Romanzo storico; Alcamo: Campo, 2008 
 Il collegio degli Studi dei Gesuiti in Alcamo; 2010; Alcamo: Grafiche Campo, 2010
 Monasteri femminili con chiese e opere d'arte in provincia di Trapani; foto di Melo Minnella, 245 pagine

See also 
 Alcamo
 Museo d'arte sacra (Alcamo)
 Basilica di Santa Maria Assunta (Alcamo)
 Giuseppe Rizzo (priest)

References

Sources 
 Di Natale M.C. Monsignor Vincenzo Regina e il Museo di Alcamo; In M. Vitella (a cura di), Museo d'arte sacra. Basilica Santa Maria Assunta (pp. 13–17); ed.Il Pozzo di Giacobbe, Trapani,2011 
 Lo frutto, i 150 anni del Liceo Classico di Alcamo, a cura di Francesco Melia e Gaetano Stellino p. 80; ed. Campo; Alcamo, 2012

External links 
 http://www.diocesi.trapani.it/content/view/1041/379/
 http://www.alpauno.com/alcamo-un-convegno-per-ricordare-monsignor-vincenzo-regina/
 http://www.tp24.it/2015/12/10/cultura/alcamo-inaugurazione-della-mostra-la-figura-e-l-opera-di-monsignor-vincenzo-regina/96359
 http://massimoprovenza.blogspot.it/2009/08/monsignor-regina-larciprete-del.html
 http://www.ideazionenews.it/articoli/25237/alcamo-riapre-finalmente-il-castello-con-un-convegno-su-monsignor-regina/
 https://www.youtube.com/watch?v=vXEVIMAVqJ0
 http://trapani.gds.it/2016/01/08/alcamo-due-milioni-contro-la-grande-sete_458756/
 https://web.archive.org/web/20160128010443/http://www.chiesamadrealcamo.it/

People from Alcamo
2009 deaths
1910 births
20th-century Italian Roman Catholic priests